is a Japanese former professional baseball pitcher. He played in Major League Baseball (MLB) for the Texas Rangers, and in Nippon Professional Baseball (NPB) for the Hokkaido Nippon-Ham Fighters and the Hanshin Tigers.

Career
On November 30, 2010, Tateyama signed as a free agent with the Texas Rangers. After starting 2011 in the minor leagues, he was called up to the Rangers on May 23, 2011, and made his major league debut on May 24, 2011. He struck out Carlos Quentin out swinging for his first major league strikeout. On May 28, 2011, Tateyama recorded his one and only MLB save during a 10-1 Rangers victory over the Royals.

Koji Uehara was his teammate in high school. In that time, Tateyama was an ace pitcher and Uehara was an outfielder. In the 2011–2012 offseason, the Rangers signed Japan's best starting pitcher Yu Darvish to a 5-year deal. Tateyama and Darvish were previously teammates for 5 seasons on the Hokkaido Nippon-Ham Fighters.

He became a free agent on October 30, 2012, when the Rangers declined his 2013 option. He was re-signed by Texas on December 20, 2012. He was then released in March 2013. He was traded to the New York Yankees in June 2013.

In May 2014, the Yankees released Tateyama, and he returned to Japan to sign with the Hanshin Tigers on June 25, 2014. On November 1, 2014, he announced his retirement from professional baseball after making 8 appearances for the Tigers.

After the retirement, he became Japan national baseball team pitching coach at the 2017 Asia Professional Baseball Championship, 2018 exhibition game against Australia, 2018 U-23 Baseball World Cup and 2018 MLB Japan All-Star Series.

Pitching style 
A sidearm pitcher, Tateyama relied chiefly on a sinking fastball that averaged 87–88 mph and a curveball in the low 70s. He also featured two other off-speed pitches, a changeup (74–78 mph) and a screwball (68–71 mph), that were used mostly against left-handed batters. The screwball is thrown with a "Vulcan" grip. He was one of only two relief pitchers to have thrown even a single screwball in the 2012 MLB season.

While his strikeout totals were average, he got hitters out with his control (career 2.11 BB/9 in NPB).

References

External links

Yoshinori Tateyama, JapaneseBallPlayers.com

1975 births
Living people
Hanshin Tigers players
Hokkaido Nippon-Ham Fighters players
Japanese baseball coaches
Japanese expatriate baseball players in the United States
Major League Baseball pitchers
Major League Baseball players from Japan
Nippon Ham Fighters players
Nippon Professional Baseball pitchers
Round Rock Express players
Scranton/Wilkes-Barre RailRiders players
People from Daitō, Osaka
Baseball people from Osaka Prefecture
Texas Rangers players
Nippon Professional Baseball coaches